Johnny Case  (born June 28, 1989) is an American mixed martial artist who currently competes in the Lightweight division of RIZIN. A professional since 2007, he formerly competed in the Ultimate Fighting Championship, Professional Fighters League, and RFA.

Background
Case was born and raised in Jefferson, Iowa. He began wrestling in kindergarten and continued through Jefferson-Scranton High School from where he graduated. He had a wrestling scholarship for college but opted to turn it down in pursuit of mixed martial arts career.

Mixed martial arts career
Case began competing professionally almost immediately, losing in the first round in his first two fights after just one amateur fight, a first-round win. He competed for various regional promotions across the Midwest for several years, compiling a record of 18–4 along the way, before signing with the UFC on the heels of an eight fight win streak in the spring of 2014.

Ultimate Fighting Championship
Case was initially slated to make his UFC debut as a short-notice replacement for Francisco Treviño to face Joe Ellenberger on June 28, 2014 at UFC Fight Night 44. However, Case did not pass an eye exam and was replaced by James Moontasri.

Case eventually debuted against Kazuki Tokudome on September 20, 2014 at UFC Fight Night 52. Case won the fight via technical submission in the second round. The finish earned Case a Performance of the Night bonus.

Case was linked to a bout with Paul Felder on January 18, 2015 at UFC Fight Night 59. However, Felder elected to fight as a replacement against Danny Castillo at UFC 182 and was briefly replaced by Francisco Treviño. On December 23, it was announced that Treviño had to pull out of the bout due to an injury and was replaced by newcomer Frankie Perez. Case finished Perez via TKO in the third round.

Case faced Francisco Treviño on June 13, 2015 at UFC 188. He won the fight by unanimous decision.

As the first bout of his new five-fight contract, Case faced Yan Cabral on November 7, 2015 at UFC Fight Night 77. He won the fight by unanimous decision.

Case faced Jake Matthews on March 20, 2016 at UFC Fight Night 85. Case lost the fight via submission in the third round. Both participants were awarded Fight of the Night.

Case was scheduled to face James Vick on February 4, 2017 at UFC Fight Night 104. However, on January 19, Case pulled out of the fight with an injury and was replaced by Abel Trujillo.

Case faced Anthony Rocco Martin on June 25, 2017 at UFC Fight Night 112. He lost the fight via unanimous decision. It was later announced that Case was released from the UFC.

Professional Fighters League
Racking two victories in the regional circuit, Case signed with the Professional Fighters League to participate as an alternate on short notice against Jason High at PFL 7 on August 30, 2018. However, High was not unable to make weight and Case was awarded a walkover victory with which he advanced to the playoffs.

In the playoffs Case was pitted against Natan Schulte at PFL 9 on October 13, 2018. The bout ended in a majority draw, but Schulte advanced to the semi-finals and Case was eliminated from the tournament.

Rizin FF
As the first bout of his four-fight contract, Case faced Yusuke Yachi at Rizin 14 on December 31, 2018. He won the fight via TKO due to a cut in the second round.

Case then faced Satoru Kitaoka at Rizin 17 on July 28, 2019. He won the bout via technical knockout after the initial round.

Rizin Lightweight Grand Prix
After the Kitaoka bout it was announced that Case would be participating the Rizin Lightweight Grand Prix. In the quarterfinals at Rizin 19 on October 12, 2019, Case faced Roberto de Souza. Case won the fight via first round knockout, advancing to the semifinals.

In the semifinals which were at Rizin 20 on December 31, 2019, Case faced Tofiq Musayev. After the back-and-forth fight, Case lost the fight via knockout in the first round.

Return to PFL
In January 2020 it was announced that Case will be returning to the PFL and participating the third season's lightweight division tournament.

Case was expected to face Loik Radzhabov on April 23, 2021 at PFL 1. However, due to an arrest, Case had to pull out and was replaced by Alexander Martinez.

Return to Rizin FF
Case challenged for the Rizin Lightweight Championship against reigning champion Roberto de Souza at Rizin 35 on April 16, 2022. He lost the bout in the first round via reverse triangle armbar.

Beynoah faced Nobumitsu Osawa at Rizin 40 on December 31, 2022. He won the fight by first-round knockout 36 seconds into the bout.

Personal life
Case has two sons – Kruz and Kuper – from a previous relationship.

On April 1, 2021, Case was arrested for domestic battery charges in Las Vegas, Nevada. Case claimed self-defense in throwing the victim to the ground to stop her from striking him. Due to Case corroborating the victim’s report that he threw her to the ground – along with his history as a professional fighter – police deemed him as the primary aggressor. The case was later dropped.

Championships and accomplishments
Ultimate Fighting Championship
Performance of the Night (One time) 
Fight of the Night (One time) 

Midwest Cage Championship
MCC Lightweight Championship (one time; former)
Three successful title defenses

Mixed martial arts record

|-
|Win
|align=center| 28–9–1
|Nobumitsu Osawa
|TKO (punches)
|Rizin 40
|
|align=center| 1
|align=center| 0:36
|Saitama, Japan
|
|-
|Loss
|align=center| 27–9–1
|Koji Takeda
|Decision (unanimous)
|Rizin 37
|
|align=center| 3
|align=center| 5:00
|Saitama, Japan
|
|-
|Loss
|align=center|27–8–1
|Roberto de Souza
|Submission (reverse triangle armbar)
|Rizin 35
|
|align=center|1
|align=center|3:32
|Chōfu, Japan
| 
|-
|Loss
|align=center|27–7–1
|Tofiq Musayev
|TKO (punches)
|Rizin 20
|
|align=center|1
|align=center|2:46
|Saitama, Japan 
|
|-
|Win
|align=center|27–6–1
|Roberto de Souza
|TKO (punch)
|Rizin 19
|
|align=center|1
|align=center|1:15
|Osaka, Japan 
|
|-
|Win
|align=center|26–6–1
|Satoru Kitaoka
|TKO (corner stoppage)
|Rizin 17
|
|align=center|1
|align=center|5:00
|Saitama, Japan
|
|-
|Win
| align=center|25–6–1
|Yusuke Yachi
|TKO (doctor stoppage)
|Rizin 14
|
|align=center|2
|align=center|4:47
|Saitama, Japan
|
|-
|Draw
|align=center|24–6–1
|Natan Schulte		
|Draw (majority)
|PFL 9
|
|align=center| 2
|align=center| 5:00
|Long Beach, California, United States
|
|-
|Win
|align=center| 24–6
|Jose Luis Verdugo
|TKO (punches)
|Iron Boy MMA 12
|
|align=center|1
|align=center|0:36
|Phoenix, Arizona, United States
|
|-
|Win
|align=center| 23–6
|Brandon Longano
|TKO (punches)
|Extreme Beatdown 21
|
|align=center|2
|align=center|3:25
|New Town, North Dakota, United States
|
|-
|Loss
|align=center|22–6
|Anthony Rocco Martin
|Decision (unanimous)
|UFC Fight Night: Chiesa vs. Lee
|
|align=center|3
|align=center|5:00
|Oklahoma City, Oklahoma, United States
|
|-
|Loss
|align=center|22–5
|Jake Matthews
|Submission (rear-naked choke)
|UFC Fight Night: Hunt vs. Mir
|
|align=center| 3
|align=center| 4:45
|Brisbane, Australia
|
|-
|Win
|align=center|22–4
|Yan Cabral
|Decision (unanimous)
|UFC Fight Night: Belfort vs. Henderson 3
|
|align=center|3
|align=center|5:00
|São Paulo, Brazil
| 
|-
|Win
|align=center| 21–4
|Francisco Treviño
|Decision (unanimous)
|UFC 188
|
|align=center|3
|align=center|5:00
|Mexico City, Mexico
|
|-
|Win
|align=center| 20–4
|Frankie Perez
|TKO (elbows and punches)
|UFC Fight Night: McGregor vs. Siver
|
|align=center|3
|align=center|1:54
|Boston, Massachusetts, United States
|
|-
|Win
|align=center| 19–4
|Kazuki Tokudome
|Technical Submission (guillotine choke)
|UFC Fight Night: Hunt vs. Nelson
|
|align=center|2
|align=center|2:34
|Saitama, Japan
|
|-
|Win
|align=center| 18–4
|E.J. Brooks
|Decision (split) 
|RFA 10
|
|align=center|3
|align=center|5:00
|Des Moines, Iowa, United States
|
|-
|Win
|align=center| 17–4
|Ted Worthington
|TKO (submission to punches)
|MCC 49
|
|align=center|2
|align=center|2:47
|Des Moines, Iowa, United States
|
|-
|Win
|align=center| 16–4
|Demi Deeds
|TKO (punches)
|MCC 46
|
|align=center|2
|align=center|4:12
|Des Moines, Iowa, United States
|
|-
|Win
|align=center| 15–4
|Sean Wilson
|TKO (submission to punches)
|MCC 44
|
|align=center|1
|align=center|4:07
|Des Moines, Iowa, United States
|
|-
|Win
|align=center| 14–4
|Jay Ellis
| KO (punch)
|Brutaal: Fight Night
|
|align=center|1
|align=center|2:30
|Red Wing, Minnesota, United States
|
|-
|Win
|align=center| 13–4
|Derek Getzel
|Decision (unanimous)
|Brutaal: Fight Night
|
|align=center|3
|align=center|5:00
|Red Wing, Minnesota, United States
|
|-
|Win
|align=center| 12–4
|Lonnie Scriven
|KO (punch)
|MCC 33
|
|align=center|1
|align=center|0:18
|Des Moines, Iowa, United States
|
|-
|Win
|align=center| 11–4
|Jeremy Castro
|TKO (punches)
|MCC 31
|
|align=center|2
|align=center|0:29
|Des Moines, Iowa, United States
|
|-
|Loss
|align=center| 10–4
|Rick Glenn
|TKO (submission to punches)
|MCC 29
|
|align=center|1
|align=center|4:07
|Des Moines, Iowa, United States
|
|-
|Win
|align=center| 10–3
|Tyler Mills
|KO (punches)
|Brutaal: Fight Night
|
|align=center|1
|align=center|0:31
|Jefferson, Iowa, United States
|
|-
|Win
|align=center| 9–3
|Mike Miller
|Submission (rear-naked choke)
|MCC 26
|
|align=center|1
|align=center|1:02
|Des Moines, Iowa, United States
|
|-
|Loss
|align=center| 8–3
|Derek Getzel
|TKO (punches)
|Brutaal: Strikeforce Final
|
|align=center|1
|align=center|2:05
|Minneapolis, Minnesota, United States
|
|-
|Win
|align=center| 8–2
|James Winters
|KO (punches)
|Iowa Insanity: II
|
|align=center|1
|align=center|0:52
|Boone, Iowa, United States
|
|-
|Win
|align=center| 7–2
|Brandon Bergeron
|TKO (punches)
|Brutaal Fight Night
|
|align=center|1
|align=center|1:18
|St. Paul, Minnesota, United States
|
|-
|Win
|align=center| 6–2
|Gabe Walbridge
|Submission (guillotine choke)
|Ambition Promotions: The Crucible
|
|align=center|2
|align=center|0:29
|St. Paul, Minnesota, United States
|
|-
|Win
|align=center| 5–2
|Roland Larson
|KO (punch)
|Brutaal Fight Night
|
|align=center|1
|align=center|0:59
|Ames, Iowa, United States
|
|-
|Win
|align=center| 4–2
|Nate Boebel
|KO (punches)
|Brutaal Fight Night
|
|align=center|1
|align=center|0:51
|LaCrosse, Wisconsin, United States
|
|-
|Win
|align=center| 3–2
|Travis Nath
|Submission (choke) 
|Brutaal Fight Night
|
|align=center|1
|align=center|1:03
|Maplewood, Minnesota, United States
|
|-
|Win
|align=center| 2–2
|Tim Morris
|TKO (punches)
|Brutaal Fight Night
|
|align=center|1
|align=center|2:50
|Jefferson, Iowa, United States
|
|-
|Win
|align=center| 1–2
|Jerald Steer
|KO (punch)
|Brutaal Fight Night
|
|align=center|1
|align=center|0:48
|Elko, Minnesota, United States
|
|-
|Loss
|align=center| 0–2
|Marcus LeVesseur
|KO (punch)
|Seconds Out/Vivid MMA
|
|align=center|1
|align=center|0:23
|St. Paul, Minnesota, United States
|
|-
|Loss
|align=center| 0–1
|Chad Murphy
|Submission (armbar)
|Brutaal Fight Night
|
|align=center|1
|align=center|N/A
|Maplewood, Minnesota, United States
|
|-

Professional boxing record

Entrepreneur career
Case made it public in 2016 that he was making his first investment, by purchasing Midwest Cage Championship from MCC founder, Ryan Hass. Based out of Des Moines, Iowa, Johnny Hollywood got his start in MMA by fighting for MCC and would eventually become the MCC Lightweight Champion.

Case has stated that he is actively pursuing his life outside of his MMA career, as an entrepreneur and investor, with his Venture Capital firm. Hollywood established his firm in 2015 and started to pick up steam in 2016.

See also

 List of male mixed martial artists

References

External links
 Johnny Hollywood website
 
 

Living people
1989 births
American male mixed martial artists
Lightweight mixed martial artists
Mixed martial artists utilizing boxing
Mixed martial artists utilizing Brazilian jiu-jitsu
Mixed martial artists from Iowa
People from Jefferson, Iowa
Ultimate Fighting Championship male fighters
American male boxers
American practitioners of Brazilian jiu-jitsu